Again and Again may refer to:

Albums
 Again and Again (Chick Corea album), a 1983 album by Chick Corea
 Again and Again (Oliver Lake album), a 1991 album
 Again & Again, a 2010 album by Thieves Like Us

Songs
 "Again and Again" (2PM song)
 "Again & Again" (Fancy song)
 "Again and Again" (Jewel song)
 "Again and Again" (Status Quo song)
 "Again & Again" (Taproot song)
 "Again & Again", a song by The Bird and the Bee from Again and Again and Again and Again
 "Again and Again", a song by Fireworks from All I Have to Offer Is My Own Confusion
 "Again and Again", a song by The Hospitals from The Hospitals
 "Again and Again", a song by Keane from Perfect Symmetry
 "Again & Again", a song by The Bird and The Bee from their self-titled album
 "Again and Again", a song by Bob Mould from District Line

See also 
 Again (disambiguation)